718 Naval Air Squadron (718 NAS) was a Naval Air Squadron of the Royal Navy created on 15 July 1936 to serve as a Catapult Flight of the Fleet Air Arm. It was elevated to squadron status at the end of 1937, before being disbanded on 21 January 1940. It was re-formed on 5 June 1944 to operate as the Army Co-operation Naval Operational Training Unit before being disbanded again on 1 November 1945. On 23 August 1946 it was reformed for the third time to operate as a Seafire Conversion Squadron but was disbanded less than one year later, on 17 March 1947. On 25 April 1955, after almost a decade, the squadron was reformed once more to train RNVR on jet aircraft. Once this work was complete, it was disbanded for the final time on 31 December 1955.

History

Initial Formation 
718 NAS originally came into being as a Flight-sized unit following a renumbering of the No. 433 (Catapult) Flight and operated in the 8th Cruiser Squadron in the America and West Indies Station.

The unit was initially equipped with Fairey IIIFs and Hawker Ospreys, and was stationed aboard the Leander-class cruisers HMS Apollo and HMS Ajax, and the York-class cruisers HMS Exeter and HMS York. The unit began to requip with Fairey Seafoxes and Supermarine Walruses, with the final Osprey being replaced in 1937. At the end of the year the unit was granted Squadron-status whilst stationed at Bermuda.

Second World War 

In 1939, at the beginning of the Second World War, operated five Supermarine Walruses and six Fairey Seafoxes based on six cruisers. Around this time HMS Apollo departed, and was replaced by HMS Berwick, HMS Orion, and HMAS Perth. 

Not long after the war began, on 21 January 1940, the squadron was merged into No. 700 Squadron.

Four years later, on 5 June 1944, the unit was reformed to operate as an Army Co-operation Training Unit, with its base at RNAS Henstridge. It was equipped with nine Seafire IIIs and six Spitfire XIIIs. In its role as an Army Co-operation Training Unit the unit trained new pilots in a variety of tactical reconnaissance techniques so they could replace experienced pilots on already on deployment. They also operated an Air Combat course.

The following year the unit was operating in a new role as the School of Naval Air Reconnaissance, but was rebased, on 17 August 1945, to RNAS Ballyhalbert  and had its role change again, this time to the No.4 Naval Air Fighting School. The unit received some North American Harvard training aircraft, and had its Spitfire XIIIs replaced by Vought F4U Corsairs. On 1 November 1945 the squadron was merged in 794 Naval Air Squadron.

Post War 

On 23 August 1946 the squadron was reformed for the third time at RNAS Eglington to operate as a Seafire conversion squadron within the 51st Training Air Group, but was transferred to the 52nd Training Group in November of that year. In its role as a conversion squadron the unit worked with Supermarine Seafire IIIs and XVs, North American Harvards, and Miles Masters. On 17 March 1947, the squadron was disbanded for the penultimate time.

Jet Era 

Almost a decade later, on 26 April 1955, the squadron was reformed at RNAS Stretton, this time to train Royal Naval Reserve pilots of the 1831 Naval Air Squadron in the use of the Supermarine Attacker and de Havailland Sea Vampire. Early in the year the unit moved to RAF Honiley to work with the 1833 Naval Air Squadron in the same role.

The unit was disbanded for the final time on 31 December 1955 once it had completed its work.

Aircraft Operated 
The squadron operated a variety of different aircraft and versions:

 Fairy III
 Hawker Osprey
 Supermarine Walrus
 Fairey Seafox
 Supermarine Spitfire
 Vought F4U Corsair
 North American Harvard
 Miles Master
 Supermarine Attacker
 de Havilland Sea Vampire

References

Citations

Bibliography

700 series Fleet Air Arm squadrons
Military units and formations established in 1936
Military units and formations of the Royal Navy in World War II